Ray Van Cleef (c. 1911 – May 26, 1964) was an American baseball player, artist's model, magazine editor, physical culturist and columnist.

Life
Van Cleef was born circa 1911. He took up weightlifting in Siegmund Klein's gym. He played college baseball at Rutgers University, where he won the College World Series Most Outstanding Player Award in 1950.

Van Cleef was an artist's model. He was "once in demand by sculptors as a model for Grecian gods." He may have been the original small scale model for Prometheus, a sculpture designed by Paul Manship in Rockefeller Center, even though Leonardo Nole is often credited as the only model.

Van Cleef was the owner of a gym in San Jose, California. He trained the New York Giants, a baseball team in New York City. He also trained Olympic weightlifters, and he organized weightlifting competitions like the Santa Clara Valley Invitational Tournament in 1963.

Van Cleef resided in San Jose, California with his wife Virginia and their two daughters, Lois and Martha. He died of a heart attack on May 26, 1964, at age 53.

Physical culture

Van Cleef was an associate editor at Strength & Health, for which he wrote a column called Strong Men Around the World. In his columns, he wrote about wrist-wrestling competitions and walkathons. Van Cleef was one of the few vegetarians involved in physical culture. He was supportive of the American Vegetarian Convention and in 1949 commented that the vegetarian movement needed to clean itself up by dissociating itself from cultists or those making unrealistic claims.

References

1964 deaths
American artists' models
American columnists
Baseball players from San Jose, California
College World Series Most Outstanding Player Award winners
People associated with physical culture
Rutgers Scarlet Knights baseball players
Strength training writers
Year of birth uncertain